Syneta simplex is a species of leaf beetle found in North America. The species includes the two subspecies Syneta simplex simplex, which lives at elevations considerably below timberline and feeds on Garry oak (Quercus garryana), and Syneta simplex subalpina, which is found near timberline in Washington and British Columbia and feeds on alpine fir (Abies lasiocarpa).

References

Further reading

 

Synetinae
Articles created by Qbugbot
Beetles described in 1857
Taxa named by John Lawrence LeConte